"Life Goes On" is a song by American rapper Lil Baby featuring  fellow American rappers Gunna and Lil Uzi Vert from the former's debut studio album Harder Than Ever (2018). The song was written by the artists alongside producer Quay Global.

Composition
The song sees the rappers delivering boastful lyrics about their lifestyles. Lil Baby uses his signature melodic flow as he sing-raps about his popularity and having many prostitutes. The next verse is performed by Gunna, while Lil Uzi Vert performs an eight-line verse about having prostitutes in different cities and their Patek Philippe SA.

Critical reception
The song received generally favorable reviews from critics. Israel Daramola of Spin wrote the song was especially one of the "solid records" from Harder Than Ever. Kenan Draughorne of HipHopDX cited the song as an example in which "subtle melodies in his delivery elevate his blistering flow to another level", adding that "Lil Uzi Vert and Gunna contribute impressive verses as well".

Charts

Certifications

References

2018 songs
Lil Baby songs
Gunna (rapper) songs
Lil Uzi Vert songs
Song recordings produced by Quay Global
Songs about prostitutes
Songs written by Lil Baby
Songs written by Gunna (rapper)
Songs written by Lil Uzi Vert
Songs written by Quay Global